In enzymology, a pantetheine-phosphate adenylyltransferase is an enzyme that catalyzes the chemical reaction

ATP + 4'-Phosphopantetheine diphosphate + 3'-dephospho-CoA

Thus, the two substrates of this enzyme are ATP and 4'-Phosphopantetheine, whereas its two products are diphosphate and 3'-dephospho-CoA.

This enzyme belongs to the family of transferases, specifically those transferring phosphorus-containing nucleotide groups (nucleotidyltransferases).  The systematic name of this enzyme class is ATP:pantetheine-4'-phosphate adenylyltransferase. Other names in common use include dephospho-CoA pyrophosphorylase, pantetheine phosphate adenylyltransferase, dephospho-coenzyme A pyrophosphorylase, and 3'-dephospho-CoA pyrophosphorylase.  This enzyme participates in pantothenate and coa biosynthesis.

Structural studies

References

 
 
 
 
 

EC 2.7.7
Enzymes of known structure